Reanimation (typeset as [REAИIMATIOИ]) is the first remix album by American rock band Linkin Park, released on July 30, 2002, through Warner Bros. Records, as a follow-up to their 2000 debut studio album, Hybrid Theory. Recorded during the Hybrid Theory tour, it features remixes of songs from Hybrid Theory, including the album's bonus tracks. It was produced by Mike Shinoda and mixed by Mark "Spike" Stent. It is the fourth best selling remix album of all time.

Release and promotion

Singles
"Pts.OF.Athrty", the remix of "Points of Authority" by Jay Gordon of Orgy, was released as the first and only official single from Reanimation. The single also features B-sides "H! Vltg3", the remix of "High Voltage" by Evidence and DJ Babu featuring additional vocals by Pharoahe Monch, as well as a remix of "By Myself", entitled "Buy Myself", by American musician Marilyn Manson.

"Enth E Nd", "Frgt/10", "Songs from Reanimation" and "My<Dsmbr" were released as radio promotional singles.

Music videos
The official video for "Pts.OF.Athrty" depicts a completely CGI-animated battle between robots, ruled by the heads of Linkin Park members, and an alien race.

MTV 2 made videos for each song of the album for its playback of the album on "MTV:Playback" which aired only a few times. These include: "Opening" (a girl going to bed), "Pts.OF.Athrty" (the US flag up to 1:05, then a motorcycle chase), "Enth E Nd" (Mike Shinoda, KutMasta Kurt and Motion Man performing their respective parts and verses in the back of a car. This was the only video to show the actual performers of the song), "[Chali]" (the girl in bed and shots of her room), "Frgt/10" (the girl from the "Opening" doing graffiti in a town while evading the police chopper), "P5hng Me A*wy" (a cannibal at work), "Plc. 4 Mie Hæd" (the girl singing to the song), "X-Ecutioner Style" (a cartoon boy walking around town, singing Chester's "Shut Up" parts), "H! Vltg3" (a night in the life of a man), "[Riff Raff]" (the girl in bed), "Wth>You" (very quick montage of Mugshots of people in sync with the song), "Ntr\Mssion" (the girl in bed), "Ppr:Kut" (shots of people's reactions to an unexpected loud noise while listening to music; Joe Hahn made a cameo appearance in this video), "Rnw@y" (a woman with a Mohawk in town, running in each chorus of the song), My<Dsmbr (a man obviously lives on the beach and does some amusements in an amusement park), "[Stef]" (the girl in bed), "By_Myslf" (a woman in a forest), "Kyur4 th Ich" (people breakdancing, Joe Hahn made another appearance as his cameo), "1Stp Klosr" (depicts a failing relationship), and "Krwlng" (animation of a white stick man).

Only the MTV 2 videos of "Frgt/10" and "Kyur4 th Ich" were officially released on the DVD-A edition of the album, along with the official "Pts.OF.Athrty" video. The videos of "Pts.OF.Athrty", "Enth E Nd", "Frgt/10", and "Kyur4 th Ich" were the only videos to be considered "official".

Editions 
Reanimation's standard edition came in a digipak case with 20 tracks. The Japanese edition included "Buy Myself" as a bonus track. The iTunes release, in addition to "Buy Myself", also included live recordings of "One Step Closer" and "My December", originally released as B-sides for "Faint" and "Somewhere I Belong" respectively.

Also released was a DVD-A version with surround sound and music videos for "Pts.Of.Athrty", "Frgt/10", and "Kyur4 Th Ich". Linkin Park Underground 1.0 members received the DVD-A edition for free as a Christmas gift.

A test release of a DualDisc version was sold in Boston and Seattle only. This edition contained the album on one side of the disc and special content on the other. It never progressed beyond the test run and thus the DualDisc edition is difficult to obtain.

The entire album was later re-released in 2020 on CD, vinyl and digital format as part of the 20th Anniversary Edition of Hybrid Theory, with "Buy Myself" also released as part of the boxset's B-Side Rarities collection.

Reanimation during live shows
Some of the material on Reanimation found its way into Linkin Park's live shows, as attested by the presence on Live in Texas of "P5hng Me A*wy", which had been played during the band's touring from the summer 2003 through the winter of 2004. The bridge from "1Stp Klosr" and the instrumental portion of "Wth>You" have been played during performances of "One Step Closer" and "With You" from 2003 to 2006. For some shows, Jonathan Davis of Korn went on stage to perform the bridge of "1Stp Klosr" while the band performed the original "One Step Closer". "Pts.OF.Athrty" was used as an intro to "Points of Authority" for Linkin Park's summer touring in 2004. "Frgt/10" was played once in 2005, during a Music for Relief benefit show with Chali 2na, where Jurassic 5 was also present. In addition, the intro to "Krwlng" has often served as the intro to "Crawling" during live performances in 2004, while a shortened version was used in 2003 and as the intro of the band's Live 8 set.  In winter 2008, the "Krwlng" intro made its return to the show. Starting at Projekt Revolution 2008, Shinoda started incorporating the first verse of "Hands Held High" over the instrumental, which started after the verse was performed a cappella at a show on June 29, 2008 at the National Bowl in England, which can be seen on the band's second live album, Road to Revolution: Live at Milton Keynes. "Hands Held High" would remain over the "Krwlng" intro through 2009. Occasionally, the first verse would be performed a capella with the second verse performed over the instrumental. "Enth E Nd" was played live but not under Linkin Park, it was played under Fort Minor (Mike Shinoda's side project). Chester Bennington came out and sang his part on the song. This was the first time a song from Linkin Park was debuted under another band, but it was played with two of Linkin Park band members (Shinoda and Bennington). In Mike Shinoda's year-long Post Traumatic Tour throughout 2018-2019, Mike rapped the first verse of "Enth E Nd" over the second verse of the stripped down version of "In The End" during the tour's final stop in Manila.

Critical reception

Reanimation was met with mixed reviews from critics. It helped the many underground hip hop artists that it featured reach a larger audience, as well as changing the nature of the work so significantly (restructuring songs, adding or substantially changing verses, and adding several guest artists) that it could be considered an entirely new album. The album received an average score of 60 from Metacritic. Reviewer Stephen Thomas Erlewine of AllMusic considered the album "a welcome step in the right direction," and he praised Reanimation for attempting to break new ground. Linkin Park have also stated that this album could be considered both a remix and studio album. The album reached a peak position of #2 on the Billboard 200 and stayed on the list for 33 straight weeks. It sold 270,000 copies in its debut week., and nearly two million overall. It became the fourth best-selling remix album of all time.

In popular culture
At the 2010 Vancouver Winter Olympics, British ice dancers Sinead and John Kerr skated to "Krwlng".

In 2011, magician Dynamo walked across the Thames River. This was shown during his TV show Dynamo: Magician Impossible while the song "Krwlng" played over it.

Track listing

iTunes
The videos for "Pts.OF.Athrty", "Frgt/10" and "Kyur4 Th Ich" are the only videos of Reanimation to be available for purchase on iTunes.

DVD-Audio
Contains the complete album mixed in 5.1 surround sound, along with the music videos for "Pts.OF.Athrty", "Frgt/10", and "Kyur4 th Ich", as well as the making of "Pts.OF.Athrty" feature. This is only available in a DVD-Audio format. It plays in most DVD players and DVD-A compatible DVD players. This version was originally distributed to members of the Linkin Park Underground, who signed up before November 10, 2002, for free. It was also made into a DualDisc format which contained the CD version on one side and the DVD-Audio on the other.

DualDisc version
This album was included among a group of 15 DualDisc releases that were test marketed in two cities: Boston and Seattle. The DualDisc has the standard album on one side, and the DVD-Audio track listing on the second side. The DualDisc version was not reissued after the test market run.

Demos
There are currently four known demos from the Reanimation recording sessions – one for "1stp Klosr", only remixed by the Humble Brothers without Jonathan Davis (this was a hidden feature on the DVD Frat Party at the Pankake Festival), a demo of "Pts.OF.Athrty" remixed by Jay Gordon, an original demo version of the "Plc.4 Mie Hæd" remix by Amp Live and a "Frgt/10" demo that surfaced on a fansite called LPLive over 10 years after the release of Reanimation, featuring a different mix as well as lyrics. These have not been commercially released, but they have become popular online and amongst Linkin Park fans.

Outtakes
Remixes were also crafted by Tricky, Prince Paul, DJ Z-Trip, and Team Sleep ("My December").

Tracks 1, 4, 8, 9, 10, 12, 15, and 16 are not on Hybrid Theory. Tracks 9 and 15 are remixes of Hybrid Theory B-sides, while the rest were created specifically for Reanimation.

Charts

Weekly charts

Year-end charts

Certifications

Personnel

Linkin Park
 Chester Bennington – vocals
 Rob Bourdon – drums, percussion
 Brad Delson – lead guitar
 Phoenix – bass guitar on "By_Myslf"; violin, and cello on "Opening" and "Krwlng"
 Chairman Hahn – turntables, samples, programming; scratching on "Frgt/10"
 Mike Shinoda – lead and rap vocals; rhythm guitar on "P5hng Me A*wy" and "Wth>You"; keyboard, piano, samplers
Production
 Don Gilmore – producer (original recordings)
 Andy Wallace – mixing (original recordings)
 Mike Shinoda – producer, art direction, design, art
 Mark "Spike" Stent – mixing
 David Treahearn – mixing assistant
 Paul "P-Dub" Walton – ProTools engineer
 Brian "Big Bass" Gardner – mastering, digital editing
 Nancie Stern – sample clearance
 Tom Whalley – A&R
 Kevin Sakoda – A&R, marketing director
 Jeff Blue – A&R
 Natalie Preston – A&R coordination
 Peter Standish – marketing director
 Rob McDermott – worldwide representation
 Clay Patrick McBride – photography
 Flem – art direction, design
 Joseph Hahn – art

Additional musicians and interpretations
 Jay Gordon – interpretation on "Pts.OF.Athrty"
 Nova – programming, interpretation on "Pts.OF.Athrty"
 Doug Trantow – additional programming, additional producer, engineer on "Pts.OF.Athrty"
 KutMasta Kurt – interpretation on "Enth E Nd"
 Motion Man – vocals on "Enth E Nd"
 The Alchemist – interpretation on "Frgt/10"
 Chali 2na – vocals on "Frgt/10"
 Stephen Richards – vocals on "P5hng Me A*wy"
 AmpLive – interpretation on "Plc.4 Mie Hæd"
 Baba Zumbi – vocals on "Plc.4 Mie Hæd"
 Sean C – producer on "X-Ecutioner Style"
 Roc Raida – interpretation on "X-Ecutioner Style"
 Black Thought – vocals on "X-Ecutioner Style"
 Jeff Chestek – engineer on "X-Ecutioner Style"
 Ray Wilson – assistant engineer on "X-Ecutioner Style"
 Evidence – interpretation on "H! Vltg3"
 Pharoahe Monch – vocals on "H! Vltg3"
 DJ Babu – cut on "H! Vltg3"
 Porse 1 – additional production on "H! Vltg3"
 DJ Revolution – editing on "H! Vltg3"
 Troy Staton – mixing on "H! Vltg3"
 Aceyalone – vocals on "Wth>You"
 Cheapshot – interpretation on "Ppr:Kut"
 Jubacca (Vin Skully) – interpretation on "Ppr:Kut"
 Rasco – vocals on "Ppr:Kut"
 Planet Asia – vocals on "Ppr:Kut"
 Josh Kouzomis – interpretation on "Rnw@y"
 E.Moss – interpretation on "Rnw@y"
 Phoenix Orion – vocals on "Rnw@y"
 Mickey Petralia – additional production on "Rnw@y"; keyboards, programming, producer, interpretation on "My<Dsmbr"
 Michael Fitzpatrick – programming, interpretation on "My<Dsmbr"
 Kelli Ali – vocals on "My<Dsmbr"
 Greg Kurstin – keyboards on "My<Dsmbr"
 Josh Abraham – interpretation on "By_Myslf"
 Stephen Carpenter – guitar on "By_Myslf"
 Ryan Williams – engineer on "By_Myslf"
 Jonas G. – engineer on "By_Myslf"
 Erik Gregory – programming on "By_Myslf"
 The Humble Brothers – interpretation on "1stp Klosr"
 Jonathan Davis – vocals on "1stp Klosr"
 Aaron Lewis – vocals on "Krwlng"
 Marilyn Manson – interpretation and keyboards on "Buy Myself"
 John 5 – guitar on "Buy Myself"
 Madonna Wayne Gacy – keyboards on "Buy Myself"
 Tim Sköld – co-producer, engineer, mixing, programming on "Buy Myself"

References

External links
 
 

Linkin Park albums
Linkin Park video albums
Albums produced by Mike Shinoda
2002 remix albums
Warner Records remix albums
Nu metal albums by American artists
Rap metal albums
Rap rock albums by American artists